Nishada syntomioides is a moth of the family Erebidae first described by Francis Walker in 1862. It is found on Borneo. The habitat consists of lowland forests.

The forewing ground colour is dark brown with yellow patches.

References

Lithosiina
Moths described in 1862